Wheelchair tennis at the 2008 Summer Paralympics was held at the Olympic Green Tennis Centre from 8 September to 15 September.

Classification
Players were given a classification depending on the type and extent of their disability. The classification system allowed players to compete against others with a similar level of function. To compete in wheelchair tennis, athletes had to have a major or total loss of function in one or both legs. Quadriplegic players competed in the mixed events, while players with full use of their arms competed in the separate men's and women's events.

Events
Six events were contested:
Men's singles
Men's doubles
Women's singles
Women's doubles
Quad singles (mixed gender)
Quad doubles (mixed gender)

Participating countries
There were 112 athletes (77 male, 35 female) from 35 nations taking part in this sport.

Medal summary

Medal table

This ranking sorts countries by the number of gold medals earned by their players (in this context a country is an entity represented by a National Paralympic Committee). The number of silver medals is taken into consideration next and then the number of bronze medals. If, after the above, countries are still tied, equal ranking is given and they are listed alphabetically.

Medalists 

Source: Paralympic.org

References

External links
Official Site of the 2008 Summer Paralympics

 
2008
2008 Summer Paralympics events
Paralympics
2008 Paralympics